Edward Bury was a locomotive manufacturer.

Edward Bury may also refer to:

Edward Bury and Company
Edward Bury (minister) (1616–1700), English ejected minister
Edward Bury (MP), Member of Parliament for Maldon

See also
Edward Berry (disambiguation)